Miss India Worldwide 1999 was the ninth edition of the international beauty pageant. The final was held in Rahway, New Jersey United States on  November 27, 1999. About 22 countries were represented in the pageant. Aarti Chabaria  of India was crowned as winner at the end of the event.

Results

Special awards

Delegates
 – Natalie Awad
 – Neela Premlata Renu Ramdas
 – Komila “Kim” Jagtiani
 – Kavita Malhotra
 – Heera Raghubir
 – Anupama Anand
 – Aarti Chabaria
 – Sunita A. Ramlal
 – Géraldine Heeroo
 – Gaby Janita Arjun Sharma
 – Sabrina Swamy
 – Sri Rajini Sathyamurthi
 – Denisia Sookram
 – Brenda Menaka Poorajan
 – Maashi Ramdutt
 – Maya Sudama
 – Shalini Sanghvi
 – Kavita Jagmohan
 – Elizabeth Alicia John
 – Simran Kochar
 – Sharan Gill
 – Shweta Vijay

References

External links
http://www.worldwidepageants.com/

1999 beauty pageants